Fulton County Airport , also known as Charlie Brown Field or Brown’s Field, is a county-owned, public-use airport in Fulton County, Georgia, United States. It is located six nautical miles (7 mi, 11 km) west of the central business district of Atlanta. The airport's name comes from the nickname of former Atlanta politician Charles M. Brown, who served on the city council and county commission during the 1960s.  It is also called Charlie Brown Airport or Brown Field.  On the radio, however, it is referred to as "County Tower" or "County Ground".

As per Federal Aviation Administration records, the airport had 293 passenger boardings (enplanements) in calendar year 2008, 198 enplanements in 2009, and 725 in 2010. It is included in the National Plan of Integrated Airport Systems for 2011–2015, which categorized it as a reliever airport.

It is a local Class D airport located just west of Atlanta and the nearest airport to Hartsfield-Jackson Atlanta International Airport (which is just south of Atlanta), and handles much of the general aviation traffic that would otherwise go there.  The airport exists below and in close proximity to ATL's Class B airspace.

It is located very near Interstate 20, Interstate 285, and the Chattahoochee River, just outside the Atlanta city limits.  It reports ASOS weather conditions 24 hours per day as West Atlanta.  It also acted as the nearest backup weather station when Dobbins Air Reserve Base did not report overnight.

Facilities and aircraft 
Fulton County Airport covers an area of 985 acres (399 ha) at an elevation of 841 feet (256 m) above mean sea level. It has three asphalt paved runways: 8/26 is 5,796 by 100 feet; 14/32 is 4,157 by 100 feet (1,267 x 30 m); 9/27 is 2,801 by 60 feet (854 x 18 m). It is currently under the management of the Fulton County Public Works Department.  David E. Clark is the Fulton County Public Works Director and Tim Beggerly is the Airport Manager.

In 2015, the airport had exactly 60,000 general aviation aircraft operations, an average of 164 per day; a 52% decrease from 2008. In May 2017, there were 82 aircraft based at this airport: 30 single-engine, 12 multi-engine, 35 jet, and 5 helicopter.

The Airport houses a Georgia Army National Guard armory.

References

External links 
 FTY - Fulton County Airport-Brown Field at Georgia DOT website
 Aerial image as of April 2002 from USGS The National Map
 
 

Airports in Georgia (U.S. state)
Buildings and structures in Atlanta
Transportation in Atlanta
Transportation in Fulton County, Georgia